Michael James McDermott (January 18, 1893 – October 19, 1970) was an American breaststroke swimmer and water polo player who competed in the 1912 Summer Olympics and in the 1920 Summer Olympics. He was born and died in Chicago, Illinois.

In 1912 he was disqualified in the 200-meter breaststroke event as well as in the 400-meter breaststroke competition. Eight years later he was eliminated in the semi-finals of the 200-meter breaststroke event as well as in the semi-finals of the 400-meter breaststroke competition. At the 1920 Games he was also part of the American water polo team which finished fourth in the Olympic tournament.  He played in two matches.

McDermott was inducted into the International Swimming Hall of Fame as an "Honor Swimmer" in 1969. He was inducted into the USA Water Polo Hall of Fame.

See also
 List of members of the International Swimming Hall of Fame

References

External links
 

1893 births
1970 deaths
American male breaststroke swimmers
American male water polo players
Olympic swimmers of the United States
Olympic water polo players of the United States
Sportspeople from Chicago
Swimmers at the 1912 Summer Olympics
Swimmers at the 1920 Summer Olympics
Water polo players at the 1920 Summer Olympics
Swimmers from Chicago
Water polo players from Chicago